Lal Ronger Duniya is a 2008 Bengali Movie directed by Nilanjan Bhattacharya and produced by Kaustuv Roy. The story was written by Rupak Saha. The film stars Debashree Roy as the protagonist. The film was a major debacle at box office.

Plot
Himan, a boy from a good family accidentally lands up in a red light area after his spots his sister in that area. One day who refuse to recognize him. He is thrashed by then local goon, but he is saved by Altamasi, a brothel owner who in due course of time brings him up as her own son. Other sex workers try to poison Altamasi's mind against Himan, but she has immense belief in him. Himan who has an excellent academic record gives tuitions to earn some money. He is very fond of Dolly, Altamasi's younger daughter and wants her to be away from this bad world. He has two friends called Shiuli and Mehuli, twin sisters who are totally opposite to each in character. Mehuli loves Himan, but since he never reciprocates her love; she never forgives him. In due course of time, Himan learns that she runs a massage parlour where masseuses double up as sex workers. Himan wants to do something to improve the lives of the sex workers so he becomes a social worker by chance. He is very close to Dallia, a former sex worker who runs a high class brothel, but wants to do something for this section of the society. She is made a candidate for the elections, but discovers that she has become part of the vicious circle and that in due course of time she would be eliminated by the very people who are helping her to contest the election. Shiva becomes extremely dangerous and sets a sex worker on fire after gang raping her. Dallia cannot take it any more and decides to finish off Shiva once and for all. She hacks Shiva to death and is sent to jail.

References 

2008 films
2000s Bengali-language films
Bengali-language Indian films
2008 directorial debut films